Huzhaa (Hujaa) is a rural locality (a selo) in Ivolginsky District, Republic of Buryatia, Russia. The population was 1,887 as of 2010. There are 67 streets.

Geography 
Suzha is located 15 km northeast of Ivolginsk (the district's administrative centre) by road. Nur-Seleniye is the nearest rural locality.

References 

Rural localities in Ivolginsky District